Stefan Booth (born 4 October 1979) is an English actor and singer, best known for playing Greg Jessop in the BBC soap opera EastEnders from 1 October 2010 to 21 October 2011.

Background
Booth went to school at Monkton Combe School in Bath and grew up between the West Country and Berkshire. He now lives in London.

Career
Booth played Jamie Nash in Hollyoaks from 2001 until 2002 and  also appeared as a semi-regular character, Sergeant Marc Rollins, in The Bill. In 2006, he came second in the ITV ice skating competition Dancing on Ice, partnered with professional ice skater Kristina Lenko.

On 20 May 2006, Booth appeared on a celebrity episode of The Weakest Link, featuring  famous faces from the worlds of music and dance. He was the third one voted off. In August 2006, he filmed a guest part in an episode of The Royal in Scarborough.

Booth appeared as a guest vocalist on a number of tracks by CLSM and other UK Hardcore artists in the mid-2000s.

Booth has appeared in pantomime, playing the title role in Dick Whittington in 2006 at the Gordon Craig Theatre in Stevenage, Hertfordshire with  Sheila Ferguson. He appeared in Back in Business, a 2007 comedy film as Travis Marks, the son of an ex con-man.

Booth appeared in pantomime at the Devonshire Park Theatre in Eastbourne, East Sussex from 12 December 2008 to 11 January 2009 in Snow White and the Seven Dwarfs starring as the Prince, with Niamh Perry.

In 2009, Booth appeared in the music video for James D Ingram's debut single "Looking For Love" produced by Dave Loughran and released on Motivation Records.

In 2010, Booth guested on the BBC One soap opera Doctors in  January and in four-part drama The Silence in July.

Booth joined EastEnders in October 2010 as Greg Jessop, the fiancé of Tanya Branning  (Jo Joyner). His character was axed in August 2011, but returned for a single episode on 21 October 2011.

Booth appeared as 'Prince Stefan' in Snow White at the Redditch Palace Theatre from 5 to 31 December 2011. He also starred in the 2012 production of Chicago: The Musical, playing Billy Flynn.

References

External links
 
 Stefan Booth Discography

English male soap opera actors
English male singers
1979 births
Living people
People educated at Monkton Combe School
21st-century English singers
21st-century British male singers